The 2019–20 Querétaro F.C. season wa the 11th club's consecutive season in the top flight of Mexican football. Querétaro competed in the Apertura and Clausura tournaments as well as in the Copa MX.

Coaching staff

Transfers

In

Out

Competitions

Overview

Torneo Apertura

League table

Results summary

Result round by round

Matches

Copa MX

Group stage

Statistics

Squad statistics

Goals

Clean sheets

Disciplinary record

References

External links

Mexican football clubs 2019–20 season
Querétaro F.C. seasons